Sivjan (also Romanized as Sīvjān, Seyowjān, Sīojān, Sīūjān, Sivajan, and Sīyūjān; also known as Dabestān-e Seyyowjān and Sīrjān) is a village in Khusf Rural District, Central District, Khusf County, South Khorasan Province, Iran. At the 2006 census, its population was 787, in 239 families.

References 

Populated places in Khusf County